Kim Ransa (1872–1919), was a Korean independence activist. She was also a teacher of Yu Gwansun, who organized the March 1st Movement against Japanese rule.

Early life 
Kim Ransa was born in 1872 in Pyongyang. Despite the school policy that banned the admission of married women, she successfully persuaded the educators of Ehwa Hakdang and became a student in 1896 at the age of 24. Later on, she studied at Ohio Wesleyan University becoming the first Korean woman to study abroad and earn a bachelor's degree.

Teaching career 
After her graduation, Kim returned from the United States and started teaching English and Bible in Ewha Hakdang. She then became an advisor for a student-led organization called Ewha Literary Society (E-mun-hai) which played a pivotal role for Yu Gwan-sun to lead a peaceful demonstration with other women students. Kim encouraged Yu Gwan-sun to become "a light for Korea," and join the organization. Kim then became the only Korean professor to join the establishment of the first women's college at Ewha Haktang in 1910 and eventually served as the vice principal.

Independence advocacy 
With the trust of Gojong, the last king of Joseon and the first Emperor of Korea, Kim played an essential role as a translator and an emissary in the Korean independence movement. In 1919, Gojong and Kim made plans to send delegates (including Kim) to the Paris Peace Conference seeking for foreign support for Korean independence, but the attempt stopped after the sudden death of Gojong on January 21, 1919.

Death 
In 1919, Kim traveled to Beijing in order to attend the Paris Peace Conference. After having a meal with Korean residents in Beijing, she fell ill and eventually died at the age of 47. There were witnesses that Kim's corpse turned black (potentially due to poisoning), but the official cause of death was not determined.

Legacy 
Kim is known for her advocacy for women empowerment through education. In response to a piece written by Yun Chi-ho, for example, on a journal The Korea Mission Field in July 1911 critiquing Korean women need to learn how to do household chores, Kim published a rebuttal piece in 4 months asserting that "the purpose of education for women is not to cook or sew better," and that "women students should not be blamed, with a lack of evidence, for not knowing how to do laundry nor ironing.

In 1995, Kim was posthumously awarded with the Order of Merit for National Foundation.

References 

Korean independence activists
1872 births
1919 deaths
People from Pyongyang